William Patrick James Sandford (born 27 January 1989) is a rugby union player with Aviva Premiership side London Welsh.  Born in Richhill, County Armagh Northern Ireland, Sandford attended The Royal School, Armagh. Having captained the Ulster Schools and Irish schools in his second year in those squads he was named Northern Bank Schools player of the year and subsequently joined the Ulster Academy. In 2009 he was awarded National Young Player of the Year by the Irish Examiner. On leaving school he represented Ulster U20's captaining the side and Irish U20's where he was involved in two Under 20's Six Nations campaigns and one IRB Junior World Championship.

In 2010 Sandford left Ulster to join English, RFU Championship side Rotherham Titans.  After a season under Andre Besters he made the move to London Irish on a one-year deal for season 2011–12. After making an impression in the Premiership he put pen to paper and signed a contract until the end of the 2013–14 season. He signed for the Cornish Pirates in May, 2013. On 12 July 2014, Sandford signs for London Welsh who compete in the Aviva Premiership ahead of the 2014–15 season.

References

External links
London Irish Profile

1989 births
Living people
Cornish Pirates players
Irish rugby union players
London Irish players
Rotherham Titans players
Rugby union players from County Armagh
Rugby union locks